The Cyclone programming language is intended to be a safe dialect of the C language. Cyclone is designed to avoid buffer overflows and other vulnerabilities that are possible in C programs, without losing the power and convenience of C as a tool for system programming.

Cyclone development was started as a joint project of AT&T Labs Research and Greg Morrisett's group at Cornell University in 2001. Version 1.0 was released on May 8, 2006.

Language features
Cyclone attempts to avoid some of the common pitfalls of C, while still maintaining its look and performance. To this end, Cyclone places the following limits on programs:
 NULL checks are inserted to prevent segmentation faults
 Pointer arithmetic is limited
 Pointers must be initialized before use (this is enforced by definite assignment analysis)
 Dangling pointers are prevented through region analysis and limits on free()
 Only "safe" casts and unions are allowed
 goto into scopes is disallowed
 switch labels in different scopes are disallowed
 Pointer-returning functions must execute return
 setjmp and longjmp are not supported

To maintain the tool set that C programmers are used to, Cyclone provides the following extensions:
 Never-NULL pointers do not require NULL checks
 "Fat" pointers support pointer arithmetic with run-time bounds checking
 Growable regions support a form of safe manual memory management
 Garbage collection for heap-allocated values
 Tagged unions support type-varying arguments
 Injections help automate the use of tagged unions for programmers
 Polymorphism replaces some uses of void *
 varargs are implemented as fat pointers
 Exceptions replace some uses of setjmp and longjmp

For a better high-level introduction to Cyclone, the reasoning behind Cyclone and the source of these lists, see this paper.

Cyclone looks, in general, much like C, but it should be viewed as a C-like language.

Pointer types
Cyclone implements three kinds of pointer:
 * (the normal type)
 @ (the never-NULL pointer), and
 ? (the only type with pointer arithmetic allowed, "fat" pointers).
The purpose of introducing these new pointer types is to avoid common problems when using pointers. Take for instance a function, called foo that takes a pointer to an int:
 int foo(int *);
Although the person who wrote the function foo could have inserted NULL checks, let us assume that for performance reasons they did not. Calling foo(NULL); will result in undefined behavior (typically, although not necessarily, a SIGSEGV signal being sent to the application). To avoid such problems, Cyclone introduces the @ pointer type, which can never be NULL. Thus, the "safe" version of foo would be:
 int foo(int @);
This tells the Cyclone compiler that the argument to foo should never be NULL, avoiding the aforementioned undefined behavior. The simple change of * to @ saves the programmer from having to write NULL checks and the operating system from having to trap NULL pointer dereferences.  This extra limit, however, can be a rather large stumbling block for most C programmers, who are used to being able to manipulate their pointers directly with arithmetic. Although this is desirable, it can lead to buffer overflows and other "off-by-one"-style mistakes. To avoid this, the ? pointer type is delimited by a known bound, the size of the array. Although this adds overhead due to the extra information stored about the pointer, it improves safety and security. Take for instance a simple (and naïve) strlen function, written in C:
 int strlen(const char *s)
 {
     int i = 0;
     if (s == NULL)
        return 0;
     while (s[i] != '\0') {
        i++;
     }
     return i;
 }
However, what would happen if  were passed to this string? This is perfectly legal in C, yet would cause strlen to iterate through memory not necessarily associated with the string s. There are functions, such as strnlen which can be used to avoid such problems, but these functions are not standard with every implementation of ANSI C. The Cyclone version of strlen is not so different from the C version:
 int strlen(const char ? s)
 {
    int i, n = s.size;
    if (s == NULL)
       return 0;
    for (i = 0; i < n; i++, s++) {
       if (*s == '\0')
          return i;
    }
    return n;
 }
Here, strlen bounds itself by the length of the array passed to it, thus not going over the actual length. Each of the kinds of pointer type can be safely cast to each of the others, and arrays and strings are automatically cast to ? by the compiler. (Casting from ? to * invokes a bounds check, and casting from ? to @ invokes both a NULL check and a bounds check. Casting from * to ? results in no checks whatsoever; the resulting ? pointer has a size of 1.)

Dangling pointers and region analysis
Consider the following code, in C:
 char *itoa(int i)
 {
    char buf[20];
    sprintf(buf,"%d",i);
    return buf;
 }
The function itoa allocates an array of chars buf on the stack and returns a pointer to the start of buf. However, the memory used on the stack for buf is deallocated when the function returns, so the returned value cannot be used safely outside of the function. While GNU Compiler Collection and other compilers will warn about such code, the following will typically compile without warnings:
 char *itoa(int i)
 {
    char buf[20], *z;
    sprintf(buf,"%d",i);
    z = buf;
    return z;
 }
Cyclone does regional analysis of each segment of code, preventing dangling pointers, such as the one returned from this version of itoa. All of the local variables in a given scope are considered to be part of the same region, separate from the heap or any other local region. Thus, when analyzing itoa, the Cyclone compiler would see that z is a pointer into the local stack, and would report an error.

See also
 C
 ML
 Rust

References

External links
 Cyclone homepage
 Old web site
 Cyclone - source code repositories
 Cyclone - FAQ
 Cyclone for C programmers
 Cyclone user manual
 Cyclone: a Type-safe Dialect of C by Dan Grossman, Michael Hicks, Trevor Jim, and Greg Morrisett - published January 2005

Presentations:
 Cyclone:  A Type-Safe Dialect of C
 Cyclone: A Memory-Safe C-Level Programming Language

C programming language family
Programming languages created in 2002